Phenomenal Woman may refer to:

 A poem by Maya Angelou
 A 2012 single (song) by Geri Halliwell